Clap When You Land, written by Elizabeth Acevedo, is a young adult novel published by HarperTeen on May 5, 2020. The audiobook, produced by Harper Audio and narrated by Melania-Luisa Marte and Elizabeth Acevedo, was released on the same date. 

Clap When You Land is a New York Times and IndieBound bestseller. It also received "a standing ovation" from Kirkus Reviews.

The novel is written from two perspectives, that of Yahaira Rios in New York and Camino Rios in the Dominican Republic. These two teenage girls are drawn together after a plane crashes while traveling between the Dominican Republic and New York City, leading them to discover that they shared a late father.

Reception 
Clap When You Land is a New York Times and Indiebound bestseller. It also received "a standing ovation" from Kirkus Reviews.

The book received a starred review from Publishers Weekly, School Library Journal, and Kirkus, as well as positive reviews from Bulletin of the Center for Children’s Books, and Booklist. 

Kirkus named it one of the best books of the year.

The audiobook received a starred review from Booklist.

References

See also 

2020 American novels
African-American young adult novels
Novels set in New York City
Novels set in the Dominican Republic
American young adult novels
2020 children's books